William Wakatere Jackson (born 1961) is a New Zealand politician and former broadcaster and Urban Māori chief executive. He was an Alliance MP from 1999 to 2002, and in 2017 was elected as a Labour MP.

Early life
Jackson was born in 1961 to June Jackson and Bob Jackson. He has both Māori and Pākehā ancestry. He grew up in Porirua and Mangere. In his teenage years Jackson attended Mangere College. He has worked in a number of jobs, including trade union organiser, record company executive, broadcaster, talkback radio host and urban Māori advocate. He worked at Aotearoa Radio as Radio Host. He was also the manager for the ground-breaking band 'Moana and the Moahunters' throughout the 1980s and '90s.

Political life

In 1995, Jackson joined the Mana Motuhake party, a Māori party which formed part of the Alliance. In the 1996 election, he stood unsuccessfully for Parliament. In the 1999 election, however, he was elected as an Alliance list MP. In 2001, Jackson successfully challenged Mana Motuhake leader Sandra Lee for the leadership of the party.

Jackson served as the leader of the Mana Motuhake party from 2001 to 2004 when most of the party's membership then became part of the Māori party and Mana Motuhake disestablished.

When the Alliance began to collapse in 2002, Jackson sided with the faction led by Laila Harré and Matt McCarten, and remained with the party when Jim Anderton established his breakaway group. In the 2002 election, Jackson became Deputy Leader of the Alliance under Harré's leadership, but the Alliance failed to win any seats.

Life between politics
Shortly after the 2002 election, Mana Motuhake left the Alliance and Jackson worked on setting up a new pan-tribal independent Māori party. He then supported Tariana Turia when she quit the Labour Party and founded the new Māori Party where Jackson and McCarten played supporting roles. He currently works as a community Chief Executive with the Manukau Urban Māori Authority. He is also a broadcaster and a political commentator.

 Since 2003, Jackson has run a nationwide Māori current affairs show 'Paakiwaha' on Radio Waatea.
 Between 2004 and 2009 he was the host of the award-winning Eye to Eye, a weekly Television New Zealand political debate series with emphasis on political issues facing Māori.
 In 2007 Jackson and former Labour MP John Tamihere fronted a Television New Zealand (TVNZ) show pertaining to wider New Zealand views on Māori issues called 'The World according to Willie and JT'.
 Between 2009 and 2011, he was the host of a Māori current affairs show on Māori Television called 'Willie Jackson's News Bites'.
 He has been a political commentator on TVNZ's Good Morning, Breakfast and late night shows, and has been the political commentator for TVNZ's Marae show since 2012.
 Jackson also co-hosted with Tamihere a national, award-winning talkback show, Willie & JT, on Radio Live each weekday afternoon between 2006 and 2013. This show was controversially stopped in November 2013 over the Roast Busters scandal.
 In February 2014, Jackson started a new daily national talkback show on Radio Live with former TVNZ personality, Alison Mau.
 Jackson is the chairman for the National Urban Māori Authority (Urban Māori Authorities that are nationwide); the chairman for the 21 Iwi Māori Radio Stations (Te Whakaruruhau ō Ngā Reo Irirangi Māori); and is the chairman for the Māori Television Electoral College (Te Pūtahi Paoho).

Despite the controversy that arose out of the Roast Busters scandal, Jackson and Tamihere won the prestigious North Island Whānau Ora contract in 2014 with their National Urban Māori Authority. It is the biggest independent contract that has been allocated to Māori (over $14 million per annum). Their work in the communities of South Auckland and West Auckland with Māori was seen as the primary reason for them winning the contract according to Whānau Ora Minister, Tariana Turia.

Politically, Jackson is seen as someone who supports and advises Māori candidates right across the political spectrum. He has been a vocal supporter of Tariana Turia (from the Māori Party), Pita Sharples (from the Māori Party), Rangi McLean (from the Māori Party), Claudette Hauiti (from the National Party), Winston Peters (from New Zealand First),

Return to Parliament
Jackson had considered standing for the Mana Movement in Tāmaki Makaurau at the 2011 election, but declined to run. His return to politics instead came in 2017 and with the Labour Party. Jackson stood down from his high-profile talkback show on Radio Live where he had been host for 10 years and from his political commentary role on TVNZ's Marae television series to be a list candidate and Māori campaign director for the party, at the request of then-leader Andrew Little.

Labour polled well at the 2017 general election. Jackson was elected as a Labour Party list candidate and the party won all seven Māori electorates. Following the election, Jackson resigned from his position as chief executive of the Manukau Urban Maori Authority, chairman of Te Whakaruruhau o Nga Reo Irirangi Māori, the Māori radio network and chairman of the National Urban Maori Authority. Following post-election negotiations between Labour, New Zealand First and the Greens and the formation of a coalition government, Jackson was appointed the Minister of Employment and Associate Minister for Māori Development (outside Cabinet).

During the 2020 general election, Jackson was re-elected to Parliament on the Labour Party list. In early November 2020, he was elevated to the Cabinet as Minister for Māori Development and given the associate portfolios for the Accident Compensation Corporation (ACC) and justice.

In late November 2021, Jackson apologised to the Moriori on behalf of Ngāti Tama and Ngāti Mutunga for his ancestors' role in the Moriori genocide. This apology accompanied the passage of the Moriori Claims Settlements Bill, which formalised the New Zealand Government's financial compensation settlement to the Moriori within the framework of the Treaty of Waitangi apologised.

In early December 2021, Jackson was ejected from the New Zealand Parliament debating chamber for refusing to apologise after National Party MP Maureen Pugh had objected to him calling the ACT party "right-wing fascists." Jackson had made these remarks during a debate on a bill to include two Ngāi Tahu representatives on the Canterbury Regional Council after the 2022 New Zealand local elections.

In a June 2022 reshuffle, Jackson was also appointed Minister of Broadcasting, Communications and Digital Media. As Broadcasting Minister, Jackson introduced draft legislation to merge the public broadcasters Radio New Zealand and TVNZ into a new non-profit autonomous Crown entity called Aotearoa New Zealand Public Media (ANZPM), which is expected to come into existence in March 2023.

In December 2022, Jackson attracted media coverage for heated remarks made during a live-television interview with TVNZ journalist Jack Tame on TVNZ's Q+A Show. Jackson defended the Government's public media merger efforts particularly its commitment to editorial independence and questioned the motives and impartiality of his host. He stated: 

In response, Prime Minister Jacinda Ardern expressed disagreement with Jackson's remarks but defended his competence as Minister of Broadcasting. By contrast, the opposition National Party's broadcasting spokesperson Melissa Lee described Jackson's interview as a "trainwreck" and accused Jackson of intending to "interfere  with the culture, operations and decisions" of the new public media entity. On 6 December, Jackson apologised for his conduct during the interview but defended the public media merger and accused the New Zealand media of fomenting opposition to the merger effort.

Notable relatives 
Willie Jackson is the son of Bob Jackson and Dame June Jackson, one of New Zealand's longest serving parole board members. His uncles are activist Syd Jackson and lawyer Moana Jackson. His grandfather is All Black Everard Jackson. Jackson's ex-wife is singer Moana Maniapoto. His son is award winning journalist Hikurangi Jackson.

References

|-

|-

|-

1961 births
Alliance (New Zealand political party) MPs
Leaders of political parties in New Zealand
Living people
New Zealand television presenters
Māori MPs
New Zealand list MPs
Mana Motuhake politicians
New Zealand Māori broadcasters
Unsuccessful candidates in the 1996 New Zealand general election
Unsuccessful candidates in the 2002 New Zealand general election
Members of the New Zealand House of Representatives
Radio Live
21st-century New Zealand politicians
New Zealand Labour Party MPs
Candidates in the 2017 New Zealand general election
Candidates in the 2020 New Zealand general election
People from Māngere
Willie
Members of the Cabinet of New Zealand